Harpy is a comic book supervillain who appeared in DC Comics.

Publication history
Harpy is the leader of a race of mythical bird women, first appearing in Green Lantern (vol. 2) #82 (March 1971) created by Dennis O'Neil and Neal Adams. A new version of this Harpy appeared in the New 52 continuity as a member of a rival band to Black Canary called Bo M in Black Canary (vol. 4) #5 (December 2015).

Fictional character biography

Harpy, a queen of a race of ancient Greek bird-women battled Black Canary, Green Arrow and Green Lantern under the control of the Witch Queen; a Korugarian sorceress and sister of Sinestro. The Harpy later returned (in Action Comics #443, January 1975) as a member of the Anti-Justice League as Black Canary's counterpart, teaming up with Merlyn to capture Green Arrow and Black Canary. An updated version of this character appears in the New 52 universe as the bassist of a rival band made up of fellow Black Canary villains Bo Meave (vocals), Auntie Gravity (drums) and Bonfire (guitar) that battled Black Canary and her band-mates.

References

Comics characters introduced in 1971
DC Comics female supervillains
Fictional bassists
Fictional harpies
Fictional Greek people
Fictional queens
Characters created by Dennis O'Neil
Characters created by Neal Adams